"Les frères existent encore" is the second single from Million Dollar Boy, the second studio album by French-Canadian rapper from Montreal, K.Maro. In France, this single was the singer's fifth and last top ten hit.

Track listings
 CD single
 "Les frères existent encore" — 3:39
 "Million Dollar Boy" — 3:33

 Digital download
 "Les frères existent encore" — 3:39

Charts

References

2005 songs
2006 singles
K.Maro songs